Sale el Sol (English: The Sun Comes Out) is a Mexican television daily morning program produced by Andrés Tovar for Imagen Televisión. The program is intended for the general public and includes various sections and topics of interest related to beauty, cooking, entertainment, horoscopes, sexuality, tips, reflections, promotions, interviews, shows and music. It is one of the first programs broadcast by the new Grupo Imagen's television network, launched on October 17, 2016.

It is broadcast live from the studios of Ciudad Imagen on Av. Copilco, Coyoacán in Mexico City, Mexico, and is hosted by Luz María Zetina, Carlos Arenas, Paulina Mercado, Talina Fernández and Carlos Quirarte. It premiered on October 18, 2016, and currently airs Monday through Friday from 9:00 a.m. to 12:00 p.m (UTC).

On-air staff

Current

Presenters

Contributors

Entertainment
 Ana María Alvarado (2016–present)
 Hector Vargas (2016–present)
 Joanna Vega-Briesto (2018–present)
 Manolo Carmona (2018–present)
Specialists
 Pepe Bandera (2016–present)
 Julie Salomón (2016–present)
 Rox Armendariz (2017–present)
 Odín Dupeyrón (2017–present)
 Daniel Habif (2017–present)
 Maryfer Centeno (2020–present)
News
 Efrén Argüelles (2017–present)
 Enrique Villanueva (2017–present)
 Hiram Hurtado (2019–present)

Horoscopes
 Mhoni "Vidente" (2016-2017) (2019–present)
 Mario Vannucci (2019–present)
Chefs
 Linda Cherem (2016–present)
 Ingrid Ramos (2018–present)
 Jose Ramón Castillo (2018–present)
 Antonio de Luvier (2019–present)
Reporters
 Flavio Machucca (2016–present)
 Fanny Contreras (2016–present)
 Omar Argueta (2018–present)
 Ana Alicia Alba (2018–present)
 Sajid Fonseca (2018–present)
 Eliuth Arce (2019–present)

Former

 Gustavo Adolfo Infante (2016–2020)
 Mauricio Barcelata (2016–2019)
 Natalia Delgado (2016–2019)
 Juán Jerónimo (2016–2019)
 Nacho Lozano (2016–2019)
 Estefania Saracho (2016–2018)
 Oscar Madrazo (2016–2018)
 Paulina Madrazo (2016–2018)

 Alfonso León (2016–2018)
 Natalia Coppola (2016–2018)
 Diego Barrios (2016–2018)
 Jarí Marquez (2016–2018)
 Francisco Zea (2016–2017)
 Daniel Fryman (2016–2017)
 Roberto Carlo (2017–2020)

Segments

Current

Former

References

External links

2016 Mexican television series debuts
2010s Mexican television series
2020s Mexican television series
Breakfast television
Imagen Televisión original programming
Live television series
Mexican television news shows
Spanish-language television shows